Rhododendron kiusianum, the Kyushu azalea, is a species of flowering plant in the family Ericaceae, native to Kyushu, Japan. It is a parent of a large number of hybrid dwarf azaleas. It is the official flower of Unzen, Nagasaki, and of Kagoshima Prefecture.

References

kiusianum
Endemic flora of Japan
Plants described in 1914